Wąsy-Wieś  is a village in the administrative district of Gmina Leszno, within Warsaw West County, Masovian Voivodeship, in east-central Poland.

References

Villages in Warsaw West County